Tower Block Dreams was a British documentary series that broadcast on BBC Three during January 2004, investigating the underground music scene on council estates in London and Southend in the United Kingdom. A total of three 1 hour episodes were produced and broadcast at a 9pm timeslot.

Tower Block Dreams looked at modern inner city life, through the stories of young musicians trying to make a career in music. The series showed that the underground music scene is fuelled by pirate radio stations and rappers' ambitions to become successful in the future.

The series was shot on council estates in Tottenham, Finsbury Park, Bow and Archway in London and Southend-On-Sea in Essex.

UK hip hop acts Skinnyman and Sloth featured on the first episode, Spittin' and Shottin''', and garage producer and MC Jaimeson featured on the third episode, Grimetime to Primetime.

Episodes

See also
 People Just Do Nothing''

References

External links
Raw Television: Tower Block Dreams

BBC television documentaries
2004 British television series debuts
Pirate radio